Jack Willie (born April 15, 1979) is an amateur boxer from Papua New Guinea who won the Oceania Championships 2006, 2007 and 2008 at Junior Flyweight and qualified for the 2008 Summer Olympics.

At the 2006 Commonwealth Games he won his first fight, but then lost against eventual winner Japhet Uutoni and was eliminated. At the 2008 Olympics he lost in the first round to Amnat Ruenroeng of Thailand 2:14.

External links

 Data, Commonwealth
 Oceanians 2007
 Oceanians 2008,Qualifier

Living people
Light-flyweight boxers
1979 births
Boxers at the 2008 Summer Olympics
Boxers at the 2006 Commonwealth Games
Boxers at the 2002 Commonwealth Games
Papua New Guinean male boxers
Olympic boxers of Papua New Guinea
Commonwealth Games competitors for Papua New Guinea